Titlo is an extended diacritic symbol initially used in early Cyrillic and Glagolitic manuscripts, e.g., in Old Church Slavonic and Old East Slavic languages. The word is a borrowing from the Greek "", "title" (compare dated English tittle, see tilde).  The titlo still appears in inscriptions on modern icons and in service books printed in Church Slavonic.

The titlo is drawn as a line over a text. In some styles of writing the line is drawn with serifs, so that it may appear as a zigzag. The usual form in this case is short stroke up, falling slanted line, short stroke up; an alternative resembles a volta bracket: short stroke up, horizontal line, short stroke down.

The titlo has several meanings depending on the context:

One meaning is in its use to mark letters when they are used as numerals. This is a quasi-decimal system analogous to Greek numerals.

A titlo is also used as a scribal abbreviation mark for frequently written long words and also for nouns describing sacred persons. Fig. 3 shows a list of the most common of these abbreviations in current use in printed Church Slavonic. Fig. 2 shows  'Lord' abbreviated to its first letter and stem ending (also a single letter here, in the nominative case). Around the 15th century, titla in most schools came to be restricted to a special semiotic meaning, used exclusively to refer to sacred concepts, while the same words were otherwise spelled out without titla, and so, for example, while "God" in the sense of the one true God is abbreviated as above, "god" referring to "false" gods is spelled out; likewise, while the word for "angel" is generally abbreviated, "angels" is spelled out in "performed by evil angels" in Psalm 77. This corresponds to the Nomina sacra (Latin: "Sacred names") tradition of using contractions for certain frequently occurring names in Greek Scriptures.

A short titlo is placed over a single letter or over an entire abbreviation; a long titlo is placed over a whole word.

A further meaning was in its use in manuscripts, where the titlo was often used to mark the place where a scribe accidentally skipped the letter, if there was no space to draw the missed letter above.

See also
 Pokrytie
 Syriac Abbreviation Mark

References

External links 
 The Hirmos Ponomar font for viewing Church Slavonic texts

Cyrillic-script diacritics
Church Slavonic language